is a passenger railway station in the city of Nagareyama, Chiba, Japan, operated by the private railway operator Tōbu Railway.

Lines

Station layout
The station consists of two opposed side platforms serving two tracks, connected by a footbridge.

Platforms

Adjacent stations

History
Hatsuishi Station opened on 9 May 1911. From 17 March 2012, station numbering was introduced on all Tobu lines, with Hatsuishi Station becoming "TD-21".

Passenger statistics
In fiscal 2018, the station was used by an average of 18,653 passengers daily.

Surrounding area
Hatsuishi Elementary School
Hatsuishi Junior High School
Nagareyama High School
Nagareyama Otakanomori High School

See also
 List of railway stations in Japan

References

External links

 Tobu Railway station information  

Railway stations in Japan opened in 1911
Railway stations in Chiba Prefecture
Tobu Noda Line
Stations of Tobu Railway
Nagareyama